Shaoxing wine (Shaohsing, Hsiaohsing, Shaoshing), also called "yellow wine", is a traditional Chinese wine made by fermenting glutinous rice, water and wheat-based yeast. 

It must be produced in Shaoxing, in the Zhejiang province of eastern China. It is widely used as both a beverage and a cooking wine in Chinese cuisine. It is internationally well known and renowned throughout mainland China, as well as in Taiwan and Southeast Asia.

The content of peptides in Shaoxing wine is high; however, their potential taste properties have not yet been studied.

Production
The traditional method involved manually stirring rice mash with a type of wooden hoe every 4 hours, in order to help the yeast break down the sugars evenly. Known as kāipá (开耙), it was an essential skill to produce wines that were not bitter or sour. Another skill of the winemaker would be to assess the fermentation by listening to the vat for the sound of bubbling.

In addition to glutinous rice, Shaoxing wine can be produced with sorghum or millet.

It is also bottled for domestic consumption and for shipping internationally. Aged wines are referred to by year of brewing, similar to grape vintage year (chénnián, 陳年).

Wines sold overseas are generally used in cooking, and can contain spices and extra salt. Mislabeling wines from regions other than Shaoxing is a "common fraudulent practice".

Prominent producers 
 Zhejiang Gu Yue Long Shan Shaoxing Wine Co., Ltd. (古越龍山) of Shaoxing, Zhejiang.  

 Di ju tang 帝聚堂
 Kuai ji Shan 会稽山 (named after a local mountain)
 Tu Shao Jiu 土绍酒.
Nü Er Hong 女兒紅
In 2020, a revenue of 4.3 billion yuan ($664 million) was reported by 80 rice wine makers in Shaoxing.

History 
Rice wine has been produced in China since around 770 to 221 BC and was generally for ceremonial use. During the late Qing dynasty, educated councilors from Shaoxing spread the popularity of wine consumption throughout the country and was an essential part of Chinese banquets.  Large quantities  are made and stored in clay jars over long periods of time. 

In 1980s Hong Kong, interest in Nü Er Hong, a brand of Shaoxing wine, grew due to nostalgic interest in mainland Chinese traditions, as well as references in popular martial arts novels of the time. Tung Chee-hwa celebrated his appointment as first Chief Executive of Hong Kong with Nü Er Hong.

In China, popularity has waned in favor of drinking other types of alcohols, and has a reputation for being "old-fashioned" although still used for cooking. Outside of Asia it is mostly regarded as a cooking wine.

Classification

Usage

Shaoxing wine can be drunk as a beverage and in place of rice at the beginning of a meal.  When at home, some families will drink their wine out of rice bowls, which is also the serving style at Xian Heng Inn. If not served at a meal, Shaoxing wine can also accompany peanuts or other common snacks.

Nǚ Ér Hong (女兒紅), or "daughter's (red) wine" is a tradition in Shaoxing when a daughter is born into a family. A jar of wine is brewed and stored underground from the day of the daughter's birth, and opened for consumption on her wedding day.

Huang jiu 黄酒 (Pinyin: huáng jiǔ), as it is known locally, is also well known for its use in meat dishes, in addition to being an ingredient in many dishes of Chinese cuisine. It is a key ingredient of Mao Zedong's favourite dish of braised pork belly with scallion greens – what he called his "brain food" that helped him defeat his enemies. The following is a sample list of other common Shaoxing wine-marinated dishes. It is not limited to the following:
 Drunken chicken (醉雞)
 Drunken shrimp (醉蝦)
 Drunken gizzard (醉腎)
 Drunken fish (醉魚)
 Drunken crab (醉蟹)
 Drunken liver (醉肝)
 Drunken tofu (醉豆腐乾)
 Drunk phoenix talon (醉鳳爪)

References

External links

Chinese wine
Rice wine
Shaoxing cuisine